is a Japanese visual novel developed by Purple software and was first released for Windows on July 31, 2008. The gameplay in Haruiro Ouse follows a plot line which offers pre-determined scenarios with courses of interaction, and focuses on the appeal of the five female main characters.

Story
Riku Okita commutes to school everyday, always passing a cherry blossom tree that has a legend about it; if a boy and a girl met under it, they would fall in love. One day in spring, he encounters a girl in her school's uniform under the tree. There, she tells him that he'll fall in love with her.

Characters

The game's protagonist. His parents on a business trip abroad, while he lives at home with his younger sister, Ayano.

Voiced bySoyogi Tono

Voiced byChikage Sawada

Voiced byKana Nojima

Voiced byKazene

Voiced byMirika Sawano

Voiced byMiru

Voiced byHinata Ayukawa

Reception

Haruiro Ouse was ranked 18th in the System category, 8th in Movie, and 16th in Vocal in Getchu.com's 2008 game ranking. It was Getchu's 16th best selling game released that year.

References

External links
Official Haruiro Ouse page on Purple Software's site

2008 video games
Bishōjo games
Eroge
Japan-exclusive video games
Romance video games
Video games developed in Japan
Visual novels
Windows games
Windows-only games